Tropical Storm Bret made a rare landfall on the Delmarva Peninsula in June 1981. The sixth tropical cyclone, third designated tropical depression, and second named storm of the season, Bret developed as a subtropical storm from a large area of frontal clouds near Bermuda on June 29. Moving westward, the subtropical storm intensified while producing deep convection, and was consequently reclassified as a tropical storm early on June 30. Around that time, Bret peaked with sustained winds of 70 mph (110 km/h). The storm then began weakening and struck near Oyster, Virginia as a minimal tropical storm early on July 1. Upon moving inland, Bret weakened to a tropical depression and subsequently accelerated prior to dissipating over northern Virginia that same day.

Impact in the United States was generally minor. In western Pennsylvania, locally heavy rainfall flooded some streets and basements. Elsewhere, Bret dropped  of precipitation to several states. One fatality was confirmed after a woman was killed by rip currents at Nags Head, North Carolina.

Meteorological history 

A large band of frontal clouds became situated over the northwestern Atlantic Ocean on June 27. By the following day, satellite imagery indicated that a low-pressure area began developing northwest of Bermuda, along the northwest periphery of the frontal cloud band. Substantial amounts of deep convection eventually formed north and west of the low center. Early on June 30, a well-defined atmospheric circulation became apparent on infrared satellite imagery. As a result, subtropical storm transitioned into Tropical Storm Bret later that day at 0600 UTC.

Upon becoming a tropical cyclone early on June 30, Bret attained maximum sustained winds of 70 mph (110 km/h). Around 2200 UTC on June 30, a reconnaissance aircraft flight observed hurricane-force winds, though Bret was not upgraded to a hurricane because the minimum barometric pressure was considered too high. About an hour later, the National Hurricane Center noted that Bret was moving westward toward Virginia at 20 mph (25 km/h) and entering a region of colder sea surface temperatures, causing further intensification to become unlikely. Subsequently, the storm curved west-northwestward and rapidly weakened. At 0500 UTC on July 1, Bret made landfall near Oyster, Virginia on the Delmarva Peninsula as a minimal tropical storm. About an hour later, the storm emerged into the Chesapeake Bay and weakened to a tropical depression. Later on July 1, Bret moved inland over mainland Virginia and continued to weaken, until dissipating over the northern portion of the state.

Preparations and impact 

While Bret was approaching the East Coast of the United States, various National Weather Service offices issued gale warnings. At 2000 UTC on June 30, a gale-force warning was issued for a portion of the North Carolina coastline extending from Cape Hatteras northward, including Albemarle and Pamlico sounds. Simultaneously, another gale warning was issued for areas along the Chesapeake Bay south of the Patuxent River in Maryland and on the east coast from Ocean City, Maryland to Virginia Beach, Virginia. Around 0300 UTC on July 1, all gale warnings were discontinued in North Carolina, while the remaining warnings in Maryland and Virginia were canceled about five hours later. Additionally, a small craft advisory was also posted for the North Carolina and Virginia coastlines. Officials in North Carolina closed off beaches at Nags Head, Kitty Hawk, and Kill Devil Hills from swimmers due to rip currents and tides. After Bret dissipated, the small craft warning remained in effect and mariners were told to remain in port until the weather calmed.

At the time of Bret's landfall, portions of the Mid-Atlantic states were experiencing a strong drought, though the amounts of precipitation were not enough for farmers in Virginia to save their crops. In Virginia Beach, local street flooding and a brief tornado were reported. One fatality was confirmed in North Carolina when a woman was killed after getting stuck in rip currents at Nags Head. Offshore, two boats lost contact with the Coast Guard during the approach to land, one of which washed up at Cape May, New Jersey and the other on the Virginia coast. The Coast Guard began cleanup of an oil spill at Nags Head caused by Bret off the coast. About  of the shoreline was filled with oil, little of which polluted the water. Most of the oil was thin and easily cleanup private contractor. Elsewhere, Bret dropped  of precipitation in several states. Overall, no considerable damage was reported.

See also 

Tropical Storm Dean (1983) and Tropical Storm Danielle (1992) – made similarly rare landfalls on the Delmarva Peninsula
Other storms of the same name
List of North Carolina hurricanes (1980–1999)

References

External links 
National Hurricane Center's Archive on Tropical Storm Bret

Bret
Bret (1981)
Bret